Cynon Valley is a former coal mining valley in Wales. It lies between Rhondda and the Merthyr Valley and takes its name from the River Cynon. Aberdare is located in the north of the valley and Mountain Ash in the south. From 1974 to 1996, Cynon Valley was a local government district.

At the 2001 census, the Cynon Valley had a population of 63,512, 12.1% of whom were Welsh speakers. In common with some of the other South Wales Valleys, Cynon Valley had a high percentage of Welsh speakers until the early 20th century.

Former district
From 1974 to 1996, the borough of Cynon Valley was one of thirty-seven districts of Wales. The district was formed from the Aberdare and Mountain Ash urban districts, the parish of Rhigos from Neath Rural District and the parish of Penderyn from Brecknockshire. It was one of six districts of Mid Glamorgan, and in 1996 was merged into the larger unitary authority of Rhondda Cynon Taf. Throughout the council's existence, the Labour Party held a majority of the seats on the council. The council was based at Rock Grounds on High Street in Aberdare, which was built in 1938 for one of the council's predecessors, Aberdare Urban District Council.

Parliamentary and Senedd constituency
In 1983, the parliamentary constituency of Cynon Valley was formed for the election of a member of parliament to the House of Commons. The constituency had identical boundaries to the local government district.

In 1999, a Welsh Assembly constituency with the same boundaries was formed.

In 2010, the constituency was redefined as consisting of 15 electoral divisions of the county borough of Rhondda Cynon Taf: Aberaman North, Aberaman South, Abercynon, Aberdare East, Aberdare West/Llwydcoed, Cilfynydd, Cwmbach, Glyncoch, Hirwaun, Mountain Ash East, Mountain Ash West, Penrhiwceiber, Pen-y-waun, Rhigos, Ynysybwl.

The two main towns are Aberdare and Mountain Ash.

Villages near Aberdare
Aberaman
Abercwmboi
Abernant
Cefn Rhigos
 Croesbychan
Cwm-Hwnt
Cwmaman
Cwmbach
Cwmdâr
 Gadlys
 Godreaman
Hirwaun
Llwydcoed
Trecynon
Penderyn
Penywaun
Rhigos

Villages near Mountain Ash
Abercynon
Mountain Ash/Aberpennar
Caegarw
Carnetown
Cefnpennar
Cwmpennar
Fernhill
Miskin
Newtown
Penrhiwceiber
Perthcelyn
Pontcynon
Tyntetown
Ynysboeth

College
Coleg Morgannwg has a campus in the Cynon Valley based in Aberdare.

Comprehensive schools
 Ysgol Gyfun Rhydywaun – Welsh-medium
 Mountain Ash Comprehensive School
 Aberdare Community School
 St. John the Baptist School (Aberdare)

See also
 The Cynon Valley Party

References

External links 
Sketches by the Bacon sisters; the pre-industrial Cynon valley of the 1830s

Mid Glamorgan
Former subdivisions of Wales
1974 establishments in Wales
Valleys of Rhondda Cynon Taf